The Prospect Highway is an  secondary urban road located in the western suburbs of Sydney, New South Wales, Australia. The highway provides a free alternative link from the tolled M2 Hills and the Westlink M7 motorways in the northeast to the M4 Western Motorway in the southwest and further south.

Background
The highway takes its name from the suburb Prospect, which it links to  via Seven Hills. Like many highways in the Sydney area, it was formed by linking a series of local roads, including Abbott Road, Seven Hills Road, Wall Park Avenue, and Blacktown Road.

Proposals
In 2015, the NSW Government Roads & Maritime Services commenced planning an upgrade of a  section of the highway between Reservoir Road in Prospect to St Martins Crescent in Blacktown.

Exits and interchanges

See also

Prospect Hill, a prominent hill located near the highway

References

Highways in Sydney